Solastalgia is a neologism, formed by the combination of the Latin words sōlācium (comfort) and the Greek root -algia (pain, suffering, grief), that describes a form of emotional or existential distress caused by environmental change. It is best described as the lived experience of negatively perceived environmental change. A distinction can be made between solastalgia linked to distress about what is in the process of negatively perceived change and eco-anxiety linked to what may happen in the future (associated with "pre-traumatic stress", in reference to post-traumatic stress).

The word was coined by philosopher Glenn Albrecht in his 2005 article Solastalgia: a new concept in human health and identity. He describes it as "the homesickness you have when you are still at home" and your home environment is changing in ways you find distressing. In many cases this is in reference to global climate change, but more localized events such as volcanic eruptions, drought or destructive mining techniques can cause solastalgia as well. Differing from nostalgic distress on being absent from home, solastalgia refers to the distress specifically caused by environmental change while still in a home environment. In 2015, an article in the medical journal The Lancet included solastalgia as a contributing concept to the impact of climate change on human health and well-being. More recent approaches have connected solastalgia to the experience of historic heritage threatened by the climate crisis, such as the ancient cities of Venice, Amsterdam, and Hoi An.

In different contexts 

A paper published by Albrecht et al. in 2007 focused on two contexts: the experiences of persistent drought in rural New South Wales (NSW) and the impact of large-scale open-cut coal mining on individuals in the Upper Hunter Valley of NSW. In both cases, people exposed to environmental change had negative reactions brought about by a sense of powerlessness over the unfolding environmental changes. A community's loss of certainty in a once-predictable environment is common among groups that express solastalgia. In Askland's article, he explains that the distress is caused by a lack of interaction between the society in social and political ways, that in turn affect the experience of a community. Societies whose livelihoods are not closely tied to their environment are not as likely to express solastalgia and, in turn, societies that are closely tied to their environments are more susceptible. Groups that depend heavily upon agroecosystems are considered particularly vulnerable. There are many examples of this across Africa, where agrarian communities have lost vital resources due to environmental changes. This has resulted in an increase in the number of environmental refugees throughout Africa in recent years. Solastalgia tends to affect wealthier populations less. A study conducted in the western United States showed that higher-income families experienced the effects of solastalgia significantly less than their lower-income neighbors following a destructive wildfire. This is due to the flexibility wealth can provide. In this case, wealthy families were able to move from or rebuild their homes, reducing the uncertainty caused by the wildfire. Other studies have supported the existence of solastalgia in Appalachian communities affected by mountain-top removal coal mining practices. Communities located in close proximity to coal mining sites experienced significantly higher depression rates than those located farther from the sites.

A study review over solastalgia shows 15 years of scholarly literature on the understanding between climate change, how it is measured in literature, and how it affects people's mentality.

Research has indicated that solastalgia can have an adaptive function when it leads people to seek comfort collectively. Like other climate related emotions, when processed collectively through conversation that allows for emotion to be processed and reflective function to be increased, this can lead to resilience and growth.

See also
 Ecophobia
 Ecopsychology
 Environmental psychology
 Paradise, California

References

Environment and society
Neologisms
Nostalgia
Environmental impact by effect